Ancel Namrukwen Nalau (born 7 September 1968 in Tanna) is a Vanuatuan middle distance runner.

Nalau competed in the 1992 Summer Olympics held in Barcelona, he entered the 1500 metres and finished his heat in last place so didn't qualify for the next round.
In 2006 Nalau was the athletics team manager for Port Vila.

References

External links
 

1968 births
Living people
People from Tafea Province
Vanuatuan male middle-distance runners
Athletes (track and field) at the 1990 Commonwealth Games
Commonwealth Games competitors for Vanuatu
Athletes (track and field) at the 1992 Summer Olympics
Olympic athletes of Vanuatu